On April 18–20, 1880, a tornado outbreak impacted the Midwestern United States, producing numerous strong tornadoes, killing at least 166 people, and injuring more than 516 others. The outbreak generated five violent tornadoes, including three long-tracked F4 tornadoes in Missouri that killed at least 144 people. Two of the tornadoes followed parallel paths and occurred simultaneously near Springfield, one of which devastated the town of Marshfield, causing 92 fatalities there. Other deadly, intense tornadoes occurred in the Great Lakes region and in Arkansas, including another F4 tornado that destroyed a third of El Paso, Arkansas, killing four or more people.

Confirmed tornadoes

In addition to confirmed tornadoes, the following events may have also occurred:
On April 18 a tornado may have damaged 26 structures at Oakbower in Crawford County, Arkansas.

April 18 event

April 19 event

April 20 event

Non-tornadic effects
In addition to tornadoes, there were numerous reports of severe thunderstorms. On April 18 intense windstorms affected Decatur, Wenona, Warren, Champaign, Ottawa, Peoria, Summerfield, Jacksonville, Tuscola, Clinton, Collinsville, and Chester, Illinois. These storms unroofed, destroyed, or partly wrecked numerous structures. Trees were extensively damaged and a bridge torn out as well. Early on April 19 severe thunderstorms also affected Richmond and Wabash, Indiana, along with other areas beside the White River. Telegraph wires and structures incurred substantial damage.

See also
List of North American tornadoes and tornado outbreaks

Notes

References

Sources

Tornadoes of 1880
J
1880 natural disasters in the United States
Tornadoes in Arkansas
Tornadoes in Illinois
Tornadoes in Wisconsin
Tornadoes in Michigan
Tornadoes in Iowa
Tornadoes in Kansas
April 1880 events